Annie Birgit Garde (born 3 October 1933) is a Danish film actress. Garde has appeared in more than 40 films since 1955.

Selected filmography 
 Altid ballade (1955)
 Father of Four and the Wolf Cubs (1958)
 Soldaterkammerater rykker ud (1959)
 Charles' Aunt (1959)
 Journey to the Seventh Planet (1962)
 Sytten (1965)
 Bedside Dentist (1971)
 Strømer (1976)

References

External links 
 
 
 

1933 births
Danish film actresses
Living people
People from Frederikssund Municipality